Günter Herburger (April 6, 1932 – May 3, 2018) was a German writer. He was a writer of poems, children's books, radio plays and a member of the PEN Center Germany.

Early life and education 
Herbrger was born in Isny, Allgäu. He was the son of a veterinarian. From 1945 to 1950 he attended the Urspring School in Schelklingen. He then began studying Sanskrit at the University of Munich. He also studied philosophy and theatre studies.

Career 
In 1954 Herburger broke off his studies and went on trips. He lived occasionally in Ibiza, in Madrid and Oran and kept afloat with occasional work. In Paris he had contact with the author Joseph Breitbach. In 1956 he was forced to return to Munich for health reasons. He worked on his first novel.

After marrying his first wife, Brunhilde Braatz, in Munich, the couple moved across Europe together. In 1957 they separated, and Herburger went back to Isny in the Allgäu. He sought employment at the Süddeutscher Rundfunk in Stuttgart and worked for one year on the production of live broadcasts and documentary films. During this time, Herburger managed, through mediation by Helmut Heissenbüttel, to make contacts with other writers and publish first texts.

In 1962 he married actress Ingrid Mannstaedt, with whom he went to Celle in 1963. Letters became his main occupation, and in 1964 his first prose appeared, which was well received by the critics; next to it emerged radio plays and film scripts. From 1964 Herburger participated in the meetings of the Gruppe 47 (group 47). In 1967, the Herburger family moved to Berlin-Friedenau, where the author maintained lively contacts with numerous fellow writers and with the beginning of the student movement.

In 1973 Herburger returned to Munich after the failure of his second marriage. There he married Rosemarie Leitner and began work on the "Thuja Trilogy", a romance cycle that would keep him busy until the 1990s. Herburger was politically involved as a member of the German Communist Party (DKP) and was temporarily for study purposes in the GDR; later however, given the dogmatic course of the party, he became disillusioned with it more and more. In 1973 he also founded the first cooperative bookstore in Munich together with Martin Gregor-Dellin, Michael Krüger, Paul Wühr, Christoph Buggert and Tankred Dorst. In 1974, after the birth of a disabled daughter, Herburger withdrew more and more from the literary scene, which, despite numerous prizes awarded to him, took less and less notice of him.

In 1975 he published the poem "To Improve the Feuilleton" in which he expressed his rejection of Wolfram Siebeck and other authors. Siebeck replied in the gloss "with German tongue".

Personal life 
From 1983 Herburger developed into a passionate runner, who regularly completed the marathon distance and longer distances and has reported on his experiences with this extreme sport in several books.

Herburger died on 3 May 2018 at the age of 86 in Berlin, two weeks after his wife Rosemarie, following an accident. He was buried in the municipal cemetery in Isny im Allgäu.

Literary works

1960s
Eine gleichmäßige Landschaft. Erzählungen., Verlag Kiepenheuer & Witsch, Köln Berlin 1964.
Ventile. Gedichte. Verlag Kiepenheuer & Witsch, Köln Berlin 1966.
Die Messe. Roman. Luchterhand Literaturverlag, Neuwied Berlin 1969.

1970s
Jesus in Osaka. Zukunftsroman. Luchterhand Literaturverlag, Neuwied Berlin 1970.
Training. Gedichte. Luchterhand Literaturverlag, Neuwied Berlin 1970.
Birne kann alles. 26 Abenteuergeschichten für Kinder. Luchterhand Literaturverlag, Neuwied Berlin 1971.
Birne kann noch mehr. 26 Abenteuergeschichten für Kinder. Luchterhand Literaturverlag, Darmstadt Neuwied 1971.
Die Eroberung der Zitadelle. Erzählungen. Luchterhand Literaturverlag, Darmstadt Neuwied 1972.
Helmut in der Stadt Rowohlt Verlag, Reinbek bei Hamburg 1972.
Die amerikanische Tochter. Gedichte, Aufsätze, Hörspiel, Erzählung, Film. Luchterhand Literaturverlag, Darmstadt Neuwied 1973.
Operette. Gedichte Luchterhand Literaturverlag, Darmstadt Neuwied 1973.
Schöner kochen. In 52 Arten, Verlag Eremiten-Presse, Düsseldorf 1974. (zusammen mit Birte Lena)
Birne brennt durch. 26 Abenteuergeschichten für Kinder und Erwachsene. Luchterhand Literaturverlag, Darmstadt Neuwied 1975.
Hauptlehrer Hofer. Ein Fall von Pfingsten. Zwei Erzählungen. Luchterhand Literaturverlag, Darmstadt Neuwied 1975.
Ziele. Gedichte. Rowohlt Verlag, Reinbek bei Hamburg 1977.
Flug ins Herz. Roman. Luchterhand Literaturverlag, Darmstadt Neuwied. (Teil 1 der Thuja-Trilogie).
 Band 1, 1977.
 Band 2, 1977.
Orchidee. Gedichte. Luchterhand Literaturverlag, Darmstadt Neuwied 1979.

1980s
Die Augen der Kämpfer. Roman. Luchterhand Literaturverlag, Darmstadt Neuwied. (Teil 2 der Thuja-Trilogie).
 Band 1 Erste Reise, 1980.
 Band 2 Zweite Reise, 1983.
Blick aus dem Paradies. Thuja. Zwei Spiele eines Themas. Luchterhand Literaturverlag, Darmstadt Neuwied 1981.
Makadam. Gedichte. Luchterhand Literaturverlag, Darmstadt Neuwied 1982.
Das Flackern des Feuers im Land. Beschreibungen. Luchterhand Literaturverlag, Darmstadt Neuwied 1983.
Capri. Die Geschichte eines Diebs. Luchterhand Literaturverlag, Darmstadt Neuwied 1984.
Das Lager. Ausgewählte Gedichte 1966–1982., Luchterhand Literaturverlag, Darmstadt Neuwied 1984.
Kinderreich Passmoré. Gedichte. Luchterhand Literaturverlag, Darmstadt Neuwied 1986.
Kreuzwege. Oberschwäbische Verlags-Anstalt, Ravensburg 1988.
Lauf und Wahn Luchterhand Literaturverlag, Darmstadt 1988.

1990s
Das brennende Haus. Gedichte. Luchterhand Literaturverlag, Frankfurt am Main 1990.
Lena. Die Eroberung der Zitadelle. Zwei Erzählungen. Luchterhand Literaturverlag, Frankfurt am Main 1991.
Thuja. Roman. Luchterhand Literaturverlag, Hamburg Zürich 1991. (Teil 3 der Thuja-Trilogie).
Sturm und Stille. Gedichte. Luchterhand Literaturverlag, Hamburg 1993.
Das Glück. Photonovellen. A1 Verlag, München 1994.
Traum und Bahn, 1994
Birne kehrt zurück. Neue Abenteuergeschichten. Luchterhand Literaturverlag, München 1996.
Die Liebe. Photonovellen. A1 Verlag, München 1996.
Im Gebirge. Gedichte. Luchterhand Literaturverlag, München 1998, .
Elsa. Roman. Luchterhand Literaturverlag, München 1999, .
Der Schrecken Süße. Mini-Photonovelle. A1 Verlag, München 1999, .

2000s
Humboldt. Reise-Novellen. A1 Verlag, München 2001, .
Eine fliegende Festung. Gedichte. A1 Verlag, München 2002, .
Schlaf und Strecke A1 Verlag, München 2004, .
Der Tod. Photonovellen. A1 Verlag, München 2006, .
Trilogie der Verschwendung. Das Glück, Die Liebe, Der Tod. Photonovellen. A1 Verlag, München 2006, .
Der Kuss. Gedichte. A1 Verlag, München 2008, .
Die Trilogie der Tatzen. Drei Essays von Günter Herburger und achtundvierzig Monotypien von Günther Förg. Snoeck Verlag, Köln 2008, .

2010s
Ein Loch in der Landschaft. Gedichte. A1 Verlag, München 2010, .
Haitata: kleine wilde Romane. A1 Verlag, München 2012, .
Wildnis, singend. Roman. Hanani Verlag, Berlin 2016, .

Awards and honors 
 1965: "Prize of the Young Generation", Literature (Award of the Berliner Kunstpreis)
 1967: Adolf Grimme Prize with gold for the screenplay for Der Beginn (The Beginning) (together with Peter Lilienthal and Gérard Vandenberg)
 1973: Bremen Literature Prize
 1979: Gerrit-Engelke Prize (together with Günter Wallraff)
 1991: Peter Huchel Prize
 1991: Toucan Prize
 1992: Hans Erich Nossack Prize
 1997: Literature Prize of the City of Munich
 2008: Preis der SWR-Bestenliste for Der Kuss (The Kiss)
 2011: By authors for authors
 2011: Johann Friedrich von Cotta Literature and Translator Prize of the City of Stuttgart

Filmography
Schoolmaster Hofer, directed by Peter Lilienthal (1975, based on Hauptlehrer Hofer)
The Conquest of the Citadel, directed by Bernhard Wicki (1977, based on Die Eroberung der Zitadelle)
Screenwriter
 Abschied (dir. Peter Lilienthal, 1966, TV film)
 Der Beginn (dir. Peter Lilienthal, 1966, TV film)
 Tattoo (dir. Johannes Schaaf, 1967)
  (dir. Wim Verstappen and Pim de la Parra, 1967, short TV film)
 Das Bild (dir. Volker Vogeler, 1967, TV film)
 Die Söhne (dir. Volker Vogeler, 1968, TV film)
  (dir. Volker Vogeler, 1970, TV film)

References 

1932 births
2018 deaths
People from Isny im Allgäu
People from the Free People's State of Württemberg
German Communist Party members
Writers from Baden-Württemberg
20th-century German writers
21st-century German writers